The Tokyo Indoor was a men's tennis tournament played in Tokyo, Japan on indoor carpet courts from 1966 to 1995.

History
The event was established in 1966 but had periods when it was not staged. It was played as part of the Grand Prix Tennis Tour from 1978 to 1989 and part of the Grand Prix Super Series, the precursors to the Masters 1000, from 1978 to 1988. It became part of the ATP Championship Series between 1990 and 1995. The tournament was held at the Tokyo Municipal Gym in 1978 and 1979, then the Yoyogi National Gymnasium, before returning to the former for the 1990s. It was played on indoor carpet courts.  The tournament was known for offering more prize money than most others.

Sponsorship names
The tournament was also known by its sponsorship names such as the Seiko World Super Tennis  and Seiko Super Tennis.

Past finals

Singles

Doubles

Records

Singles
Included:
Most titles: /  Ivan Lendl (5)
Most finals: /  Ivan Lendl (7)
Most consecutive titles:   Ivan Lendl, Björn Borg (2) 
Most consecutive finals:   Ivan Lendl (3) (1983–85)
Most matches played: /  Ivan Lendl (48) 
Most matches won: /  Ivan Lendl (42) 
Most consecutive matches won: Björn Borg (12)
Most editions played: /  Ivan Lendl (11) 
Best match winning %: /  Ivan Lendl, 87.5%
Oldest champion: / , Ivan Lendl, 33y 7m & 4d (1993)
Youngest champion:  Boris Becker, 18y 10m & 30d (1986)
Longest final:  Stefan Edberg v /  Ivan Lendl result: 6–7, 6–4, 6–4, (33 games), in (1987)
Shortest final:  Jimmy Connors v  Tom Gullikson result: 6-1 6-2, (15 games), in (1980)

Doubles
Most titles (same partner):  Grant Connell and  Patrick Galbraith: (2)
Most tiles (different partner):  Sherwood Stewart: (2)

References

External links
 ATP results archive

 
ATP Tour
Defunct tennis tournaments in Japan
Carpet court tennis tournaments
Indoor tennis tournaments
Grand Prix tennis circuit